A Mailslot is a one-way interprocess communication mechanism, available on the Microsoft Windows operating system, that allows communication between processes both locally and over a network. The use of Mailslots is generally simpler than named pipes or sockets when a relatively small number of relatively short messages are expected to be transmitted, such as for example infrequent state-change messages, or as part of a peer-discovery protocol. The Mailslot mechanism allows for short message broadcasts ("datagrams") to all listening computers across a given network domain.

Features
Mailslots function as a server-client interface. A server can create a Mailslot, and a client can write to it by name. Only the server can read the mailslot, as such mailslots represent a one-way communication mechanism. A server-client interface could consist of two processes communicating locally or across a network. Mailslots operate over the RPC protocol and work across all computers in the same network domain. Mailslots offer no confirmation that a message has been received. Mailslots are generally a good choice when one client process must broadcast a message to multiple server processes.

Uses
The most widely known use of the Mailslot IPC mechanism is the Windows Messenger service that is part of the Windows NT-line of products, including Windows XP. The Messenger Service, not to be confused with the MSN Messenger internet chat service, is essentially a Mailslot server that waits for a message to arrive. When a message arrives it is displayed in a popup onscreen. The NET SEND command is therefore a type of Mailslot client, because it writes to specified mailslots on a network.

A number of programs also use Mailslots to communicate. Generally these are amateur chat clients and other such programs. Commercial programs usually prefer pipes or sockets.

Mailslots are implemented as files in a mailslot file system (MSFS). Examples of Mailslots include:

 MAILSLOT\Messngr - Microsoft NET SEND Protocol
 MAILSLOT\Browse - Microsoft Browser Protocol
 MAILSLOT\Alerter
 MAILSLOT\53cb31a0\UnimodemNotifyTSP
 MAILSLOT\HydraLsServer - Microsoft Terminal Services Licensing
 MAILSLOT\CheyenneDS - CA BrightStor Discovery Service

External links
 Mailslots (MSDN Documentation)
 Using Mailslots for Interprocess Communication
 Using a Mailslot to read/write data over a network

Inter-process communication